Salt Lake Marriott Downtown at City Creek is a Marriott International run hotel located in the City Creek Center on 75 South West Temple Street, Salt Lake City Utah United States. The hotel was opened in 1981 and in 2008 underwent a name change and a multimillion-dollar renovation as a result of the city creek development. The hotel is one of only a few buildings that were built prior to the development of City Creek Center. During the 2002 Winter Olympics, the west side of the building had a full size wrap with the image of an athlete.

Facilities
The Marriott hotel consists of 510 rooms, 21 meeting rooms as well as a bar, a restaurant, a Starbucks, and entertainment facilities. The hotel also has a gym and a fitness center.

See also
 City Creek Center
 Marriott International

References

External links
 http://www.marriott.co.uk/hotels/travel/slcut-salt-lake-marriott-downtown-at-city-creek/

1981 establishments in Utah
Hotel buildings completed in 1981
Marriott hotels
Skyscraper hotels in Utah
Skyscrapers in Salt Lake City